Edward Banfield (Ilfracombe, North Devon, 9 February 1837 – London, 6 July 1872) was an English railroad engineer who drove the first locomotive (La Porteña) through Buenos Aires, Argentina, in  1857 as part of the Buenos Aires Western Railway. He was the first General Manager of the British-owned Buenos Aires Great Southern Railway between 1865 and 1872, founded in Argentina by Edward Lund in 1862. Banfield died in 1872, and the Southern Railway named the actual train station in his honour in 1873. The town of Banfield in Buenos Aires Province, which grew up till becoming a city, inherited that name. The professional Argentine football club Club Atlético Banfield with headquarters there, also carries his name.

In 1872, he felt ill, and ended as General Manager, returning to London with his wife Elizabeth, and their daughter also named Elizabeth, born in 1871 in Argentina. He died in London that same year and his daughter on 5 February 1874, age 2. Both are buried in Cornwall, according to a tombstone mentioned en Cornish-L Archives in Ancestry.com

See also
Rail transport in Argentina

References 
H.R.Stones, British Railways in Argentina 1860-1948, P.E.Waters & Associates, Bromley, London, England, 1993.

1837 births
1872 deaths
Argentine businesspeople
Argentine people in rail transport
Argentine engineers
English emigrants to Argentina
Place of birth missing
19th-century English businesspeople